Kibuye is a city in Karongi District, and the headquarters of the  Western Province in Rwanda.

Location
The geographical coordinates of the town are: 2°03'42.0"S,  29°20'54.0"E (Latitude:-2.061672; Longitude:29.348344).

Overview
Kibuye is known as a beach resort and is within driving distance of two national parks. It is home to a genocide memorial marking the massacre of 90% of the town's Tutsi population in the Rwandan Civil War. The Ndaba Falls lie near the city.

Both Kibuye Power Plant 1 and KivuWatt Power Station  lie within Kibuye.

See also

Retreat at Lake Kivu

References

External links

 On The Shores Of Lake Kivu

Western Province, Rwanda
Populated places in Rwanda
Populated places on Lake Kivu
Cities in the Great Rift Valley